Altamont  is an unincorporated community in Alameda County, California. It was in 1969 the site of the Altamont Free Concert at the Altamont Speedway. Originally called The Summit, the name was changed to Altamont when the Central Pacific Railroad arrived in 1869.

History
Altamont is derived from its former name Alta Monte (Spanish for "High Mountain"). The community was also briefly known as The Summit.

A post office operated at Altamont from 1872 to 1955.

References

Unincorporated communities in California
Unincorporated communities in Alameda County, California